Elizabeth Ray DeLong is an American biostatistician. She is a professor of biostatistics and bioinformatics at Duke University, where she chairs the Department of Biostatistics and Bioinformatics and is affiliated with the Duke Clinical Research Institute and Duke Cancer Institute.

Education
DeLong graduated  from the University of Maine in 1969, and earned a master's degree there in 1970.
She completed her Ph.D. in 1979 at the University of North Carolina at Chapel Hill.
Her dissertation, supervised by Pranab K. Sen, was Estimation of General Parameters using Progressively Truncated U-Statistics.

Career
After completing her doctorate, she joined Duke as a statistician in Community and Family Medicine and in the Duke Comprehensive Cancer Center in 1979. In 1987, she left academia to work in industry as directory of biostatistics at Quintiles, but returned
as an assistant professor in Community and Family Medicine in 1991,
and added a joint appointment in Anesthesiology in 1996. In 2001 she moved to the Department of Biostatistics and Bioinformatics. She has been chair of the department since 2007.

In 2013, DeLong was elected as a Fellow of the American Statistical Association.

Research interests
Her interests in the applications of statistics include outcomes research and comparative effectiveness research, and 
she has also published highly cited work in mathematical statistics on nonparametric methods for comparing the areas under correlated receiver operating characteristic curves.

References

Year of birth missing (living people)
Living people
American statisticians
Women statisticians
Biostatisticians
University of Maine alumni
University of North Carolina at Chapel Hill alumni
Duke University faculty
Fellows of the American Statistical Association